The Curisevo River (or Curisevú River) is a river of Mato Grosso state in western Brazil. It flows through the Xingu Indigenous Park.

See also
List of rivers of Mato Grosso

References

Brazilian Ministry of Transport

Rivers of Mato Grosso